Yu Zhicheng (born 8 July 1963) is a Chinese former hurdler who competed in the 1984 Summer Olympics and in the 1988 Summer Olympics.

References

1963 births
Living people
Chinese male hurdlers
Olympic athletes of China
Athletes (track and field) at the 1984 Summer Olympics
Athletes (track and field) at the 1988 Summer Olympics
Asian Games medalists in athletics (track and field)
Athletes (track and field) at the 1986 Asian Games
Athletes (track and field) at the 1990 Asian Games
Asian Games gold medalists for China
Medalists at the 1986 Asian Games
Medalists at the 1990 Asian Games